Burnley bus station serves the town of Burnley, Lancashire, England. The bus station was funded by both the Lancashire County Council and Burnley Borough Council. The station was opened in October 2002, at a total cost of £3M and consists of 11 stands, a travel centre and electronic passenger boards. It was designed by SBS Architects.

Services
The main operators from the bus station are Blackburn Bus Company, Burnley Bus Company, First West Yorkshire, Rosso, and Holmeswood Bus, as well as National Express.

Gallery

References

External links

 Burnley bus station - Lancashire County Council

Bus stations in Lancashire
Buildings and structures in Burnley